Dwain Donald Jacobs (born 28 January 1987) is a Guyanese former professional footballer who played as a midfielder. As of 2021, he is the president of Guyanese club Dynamics FC, which he founded in January 2019.

Club career
In early 2013, Jacobs moved to the newly-formed Slingerz. He would then go on to transfer from Slingerz FC to Alpha United in January 2014. In January 2015, Jacobs returned to Slingerz.

International career 
Jacobs made his international debut for Guyana in a 1–0 friendly win over Saint Vincent and the Grenadines on 13 January 2008. He would go on to make 42 appearances and score one goal for Guyana from 2008 to 2017.

International goals 

 Guyana score listed first, score column indicates score after the Jacobs goal.

Honours 
Alpha United

 GFF National Super League: 2009, 2010, 2011–12

Buxton United
 Kashif & Shanghai Knockout Tournament: 2012–13

References

External links 
 
 
 
 

1987 births
Living people
Guyanese footballers
Association football midfielders
Pele FC players
Police F.C. (Guyana) players
Alpha United FC players
Buxton United FC players
Slingerz FC players
Ann's Grove FC players
GFF Elite League players
Guyana international footballers